Nicolae Dobrin (26 August 1947 – 26 October 2007) was a Romanian footballer who played as an attacking midfielder and a manager.

Nicknamed Gâscanul ("The Gander") or Prințul din Trivale ("The Prince of Trivale"), he is considered one of Romania's greatest footballers. Renowned for his dribbling ability, Dobrin received the Romanian Footballer of the Year award on three occasions, in 1966, 1967, and 1971, and has a stadium in native Pitești named after him.

Club career

Nicolae Dobrin was born on 26 August 1947 in Pitești, Argeș County, nicknamed Gâscanul ("The Gander") or Prințul din Trivale ("The Prince of Trivale"), he is considered one of Romania's greatest footballers. He started playing football as a child with his friends on a field which they nicknamed "Maracana" that was close to the Argeș river and one day in 1959 some players from Dinamo Pitești came to play with them, Dobrin's team winning with 12–2 with him scoring 6 goals. After the game, Leonte Ianovschi, a coach at the youth center of Dinamo Pitești told him to come at the club's training sessions. Dobrin played for the first time in a Divizia A match when he was still 14 years old, on 1 July 1962, coach Ștefan Vasile using him in a match between Știința Cluj and Dinamo Pitești which ended with a 5–1 loss, thus holding the record of the youngest debutant in the competition. He played for Argeș Pitești most of his career, winning under the guidance of coach Florin Halagian two Divizia A titles, in the one that was won in the 1971–72 season he was the team's top-goalscorer with 15 goals scored in 23 matches. At the winning of the 1978–79 title, Dobrin contributed with 9 goals scored in 22 matches. He was decisive in the final game of the season against Dinamo București in which he scored the final goal of the 4–3 victory, his performance being appreciated by journalist Ioan Chirilă who gave him a 10 in the Sportul newspaper. 

He played 25 games and scored 8 goals in European competitions (including 12 games and 2 goals in the Inter-Cities Fairs Cup), in his first season played in European competitions he scored one goal in six games in the 1966–67 Inter-Cities Fairs Cup, as Dinamo Pitești eliminated Sevilla FC and Toulouse FC in the first two rounds, being defeated in the third round with 1–0 on aggregate by Dinamo Zagreb who eventually won the competition. In the winter of 1966, because the French people were impressed that they defeated Toulouse FC, Dinamo Pitești was invited to participate at the friendly tournament organized in Marseille called Tele-magazine International Cup, where two emissaries of Inter Milan made an offer of $250.000 to Dinamo Pitești in order to transfer Dobrin at Helenio Herrera's team, but Dinamo's officials did not want to negotiate, being fearful of possible consequences they would face by Romania's communist regime. In the 1972–73 European Cup, Argeș Pitești won a home game with 2–1 against Real Madrid in which Dobrin opened the score but lost the second leg with 3–1, however this was enough for Real Madrid's president Santiago Bernabéu to want him at the club, making a potential record breaking offer of $2 million and a nocturne installation for the 1 Mai stadium from Pitești. Because of the communist regime in Romania in that period, Bernabéu had to hold talks with dictator Nicolae Ceaușescu himself, but could not persuade him, because Dobrin was regarded as a "national treasure" and such values could not be "estranged", especially not playing in a team from the country of Francisco Franco's fascist dictatorship. It is said that this was the biggest regret of Dobrin's life, although he did eventually end up playing in Francisco Gento's testimonial, in the famous "blanco" shirt of Real Madrid. On this occasion Santiago Bernabéu made a last unsuccessful attempt to keep the Romanian player in Madrid. In the 1978–79 UEFA Cup, Argeș Pitești defeated in the home game Valencia with 2–1, Dobrin opening the score from a indirect free kick and according to his former teammate Andrei Speriatu, after the game, Mario Kempes who just won the World Cup with Argentina, being the top-goalscorer and best player of the tournament went to Dobrin and told him:"You are a great player!", however Argeș Pitești lost in the second leg with 5–2. 

In 1981 Dobrin went to play for FCM Târgovişte in Divizia B, scoring 17 goals in his first season, helping the team gain promotion to the Divizia A, where in the following season he played 13 games and scored 5 goals. In 1982 he returned to Argeș Pitești as a player-manager, making his last appearance as a player on 14 June 1983 in a 2–0 victory against Bihor Oradea. In the 1985–86 Divizia B season, Dobrin came out of retirement, being a player-manager at CS Botoșani. During his whole career, Dobrin played 409 Divizia A matches in which he scored 111 goals and he was the Romanian Footballer of the Year in 1966, 1967 and 1971. In 2003, the Local Council of Pitești decided to rename Argeș Pitești's stadium into Stadionul Nicolae Dobrin in his honor.

International career
Nicolae Dobrin played 47 games and scored 6 goals for Romania, making his debut on 1 June 1966 under coach Ilie Oană in a friendly which ended with a 1–0 loss against West Germany played on Südweststadion from Ludwigshafen. He made a good impression in the game showing his dribbling abilities in front of West Germany's experimented midfielder Horst Szymaniak and after the game, the former World Cup winner Fritz Walter went into Romania's locker room telling Dobrin:"Boy, if you're good and will drink a lot of milk, you're going to be a great player!", the press from West Germany also praised Dobrin, the newspaper 5 Uhr Blatt wrote the next day:"Game coordinator Dobrin has impressed with his demonstrated high class" and Die Rheinpfalz wrote:"Of special class is Dobrin, who for his age proves an impressive maturity and a brilliant technique". He played four games and scored two goals against Italy and Switzerland at the Euro 1968 qualifiers and played three games in which he scored one goal in a 1–0 victory against Portugal at the successful 1970 World Cup qualifiers. He was selected by coach Angelo Niculescu to be part of Romania's 1970 World Cup squad but did not play in any match, the reasons Niculescu didn't use him are unclear but the fact that he did not play is considered one of the most controversial moments in the history of the Romanian football. He played six matches and scored two goals at the 1972 Euro qualifiers, managing to reach the quarter-finals where Romania was defeated by Hungary, who advanced to the final tournament. He went to play three games in which he scored one goal at the 1974 World Cup qualifiers, three appearances at the Euro 1976 qualifiers, one appearance at the Euro 1980 qualifiers, two at the 1977–80 Balkan Cup, making his last appearance for the national team on 2 April 1980 in a friendly which ended 2–2 against East Germany.

International goals
Scores and results list Romania's goal tally first, score column indicates score after each Dobrin goal.

Managerial career
Nicolae Dobrin started his managerial career in the 1982–83 Divizia A season when he was a player-manager at Argeș Pitești. He coached Argeș Pitești on several occasions, managing the club in a total of 138 Divizia A matches. His only coaching experience except the ones at Argeș Pitești was in the 1985–86 Divizia B season when he was a player-manager at CS Botoșani.

Death
Nicolae Dobrin started smoking when he was about 8–9 years old, this habit causing him lung cancer. He died on 26 October 2007 in the intensive care unit of the County Hospital in Pitești after multiple organ failure. On 29 October 2007, his funeral ceremony, held at St. George's Cathedral and at St. George's Military Cemetery, was attended by more than 5,000 people.

Honours
Argeș Pitești
Divizia A: 1971–72, 1978–79
Cupa României runner-up: 1964–65
FCM Târgovişte
Divizia B: 1980–81

Individual
Romanian Footballer of the Year: 1966, 1967, 1971

Notes

References

External links
Official website  

1947 births
2007 deaths
Deaths from lung cancer
Deaths from cancer in Romania
Deaths from multiple organ failure
Sportspeople from Pitești
Romanian footballers
Association football midfielders
Liga I players
Liga II players
FC Argeș Pitești players
FCM Târgoviște players
Romania international footballers
Olympic footballers of Romania
1970 FIFA World Cup players
Romanian football managers
FC Argeș Pitești managers